Harry Bradbeer is a British director, producer, and writer. He is known for his work on the television series Fleabag and Killing Eve, and the films Enola Holmes and Enola Holmes 2.

Early life and education
Bradbeer was brought up in Dartmoor, Devon, England. His mother, Vivyen, was an orthoptist. His father, Thomas, was a consultant surgeon.

Bradbeer attended Marlborough College and furthered his education at University College London (UCL), where he graduated with a degree in Medieval and Modern History. While at UCL, he acted in numerous plays and directed his first short film at the UCL Film Society, Christie, which starred Adrian Schiller. This led to him partaking in the UCL exchange program where he studied Telecommunication Arts at the University of Michigan for a year.

Career
While working as a researcher and assistant to renowned film director John Schlesinger, Bradbeer directed A Night with a Woman, a Day With Charlie, starring Rufus Sewell and Richard Henders. This film opened the 1993 First Frame series on Channel Four and led to his long-standing working relationship with British television producer Tony Garnett and his production company, World Productions.

Among the productions he directed for Garnett were three BAFTA-nominated television series, This Life, Outlaws and The Cops for BBC2. The Cops won a BAFTA Television Award for ‘Best Drama Series’ for two years consecutively (1999-2000) as well as the 2002 Royal Television Society Award.

In 2001, Bradbeer directed the television political drama movie, As The Beast Sleeps, which was based on Gary Mitchell’s play about his loyalist community in Belfast at the time of the 1994 ceasefire. The film was an official selection at the Edinburgh Film Festival, London Film Festival, and Edinburgh Showcase in New York, and appeared at the Montreal, Gothenburg, Boston and New York Festivals. Additionally, in 2002, it won the Belfast Arts Award for Television and took third place at the Prix Europa Festival.

Between 2002 and 2004, Bradbeer directed A Is for Acid and The Brides in the Bath, two television films based on the notorious 20th Century British serial killers, John Haigh and George Smith. Both projects were produced by Yorkshire Television and ITV and written by Glenn Chandler. In 2005, Bradbeer directed Sugar Rush, adapted from the novel by Julie Burchill which won an International Emmy and was nominated for the 2007 BAFTA for Best Drama Series. In 2006, Bradbeer directed the television film, Perfect Day: The Millennium, which was nominated for a Rose d’Or at The Montreal Television Festival. Channel Five released the film on October 25, 2006. In 2008, he directed the fifth installment of the Messiah series for BBC 1 and in 2009, he directed Lip Service, a drama series based around a group of LGBT friends in Glasgow, for BBC 3.

In 2010, Bradbeer directed The Hour (2011) for BBC 2, starring Dominic West and Ben Whishaw, for which he was awarded "Le Reflet d'Or" at the Geneva International Film Festival for 'Best International Television Series.' In 2014, Bradbeer directed the opening episodes of Grantchester, a detective series which launched the career of James Norton. He then directed Paul Abbott's No Offence which was nominated for a BAFTA Television Award for ‘Best Drama Series’. Additionally, he was the lead director of Dickensian and the series was nominated for ‘Best Original Program’ at the 2017 Broadcast Awards.

Between 2016 and 2018, Bradbeer directed two seasons of Fleabag for BBC/Amazon, written by and starring Phoebe Waller-Bridge. Fleabag has won 48 awards including six Emmy Awards, two Golden Globe Awards, four BAFTAs, a Rose d’Or, a Producers Guild Award, and two Critics' Choice Awards. For the second series, Bradbeer won the Primetime Emmy Award for Outstanding Directing for a Comedy Series. He was also nominated for the BAFTA Television Award for Best Director: Fiction, which was among the show's six nominations.

In 2017, Bradbeer directed the first two episodes of Season 1 of Killing Eve for BBC America for which he was nominated for ‘Best Director’ at the 2019 BAFTA Television Awards. Additionally, the series won six BAFTAs at the 2019 BAFTA Television Awards including ‘Best Leading Actress’, ‘Best Supporting Actress’, and ‘Best Drama Series’. Sandra Oh won a Golden Globe Awards for ‘Best Drama Performance in a Leading Role’.

In December 2017, Bradbeer directed the US pilot Ramy for A24/Hulu.

In February 2019, it was announced that Bradbeer was to direct Enola Holmes, a feature adaptation of The Enola Holmes Mysteries by Nancy Springer, and produced by Legendary Pictures. Adapted by Jack Thorne, it went into production in July 2019 and starred Millie Bobby Brown, Henry Cavill, Helena Bonham Carter, Sam Claflin, Fiona Shaw, Adeel Akhtar, Frances de la Tour, Louis Partridge, Susie Wokoma, and Burn Gorman.

In January 2020, it was announced that Bradbeer had signed to direct the feature film Seance on a Wet Afternoon for Legendary Entertainment. Additionally, it was announced that Bradbeer signed on as co-creator and executive producer of Viewpoint, a surveillance crime thriller for ITV/Tiger Aspect. This year, Bradbeer also signed a first-look deal with Amazon to develop and create television series exclusively on the streaming platform.

In January 2022, Bradbeer was set to direct Eleanor Oliphant is Completely Fine, a feature adaptation of Gail Honeyman's novel of the same name. 

Bradbeer recently directed Enola Holmes 2 which released on Netflix in November 2022.

Personal life
Bradbeer is married to writer Nino Strachey, daughter of Charles Strachey, 4th Baron O'Hagan and Princess Tamara Imeretinsky. They have one child and currently reside in West London.

Filmography

Awards

Honours
In July 2021, the University College London (UCL), where Bradbeer previously graduated with a degree in Medieval and Modern History, awarded him with an Honorary Doctor of Literature (DLit) for his exceptional achievements and contributions throughout his career. Upon receiving this recognition, Bradbeer said: “I am delighted to receive this honour. UCL was a truly creative environment. It was here that I first explored the world of film, and I’m eternally grateful for the part it played in starting my career.”

References

External links 
 

BAFTA winners (people)
British film directors
British television directors
Golden Globe Award-winning producers
Primetime Emmy Award winners
Year of birth missing (living people)
Living people